is a Japanese manga series written and illustrated by Kazuo Hara. It was serialized in Shogakukan's seinen manga magazine Monthly Ikki from December 2002 to August 2009, with its chapters collected in eight tankōbon volumes. A 24-episode anime television series produced by TMS Entertainment aired for two seasons from January to December 2008.

Characters

Media

Manga
Noramimi is written and illustrated by Kazuo Hara. It was serialized in Shogakukan's Monthly Ikki from December 25, 2002, to August 25, 2009. An additional chapter was published on October 24, 2009. Shogakukan collected its chapters in eight tankōbon volumes, released from November 29, 2003, to October 30, 2009.

Anime
An anime television series adaptation was announced by Monthly Ikki in July 2007. It was produced by TMS Entertainment and the first season was broadcast for 12 episodes on CBC, TBS and Tokyo MX from January 9 to March 26, 2008. The second season was broadcast for 12 episodes from October 1 to December 17, 2008.

Reception
The anime series adaptation was one of the Jury Recommended Works at the 12th Japan Media Arts Festival in 2008.

Notes

References

External links
Manga official website at Ikki 
Anime official website 

Comedy anime and manga
Seinen manga
Shogakukan manga
TMS Entertainment
TBS Television (Japan) original programming
Tokyo MX original programming